Pigs of the Roman Empire is an album by the American alternative metal group Melvins and electronic musician Lustmord, which was released in 2004 through Ipecac Recordings. Adam Jones, guitarist for Tool, also makes substantial contributions to the album.

Speaking to Kerrang! in 2008, Melvins singer/guitarist King Buzzo remembered:

Track listing
All songs written by King Buzzo and Lustmord

The CD edition only lists the first eight tracks, the hidden ninth track includes two songs separated by a bit of silence. A double LP edition was released by Alternative Tentacles which lists the ninth track as "??" and also includes the original mix of "Safety Third" as an unlisted bonus.

Personnel
King Buzzo -  vocals, guitar, bass guitar, electronics
Dale Crover - drums
Kevin Rutmanis - bass guitar, slide bass, electronics, guitar, keyboards
Adam Jones - guitar
B. Lustmord - sound design, programming, production
with
Sir David Scott Stone - additional electronics & keyboards

Additional personnel
Toshi Kasai - engineer
John Golden - mastering
Mackie Osborne - art direction & design

References

 

Ipecac Recordings albums
Melvins albums
Lustmord albums
2004 albums